Satondella bicristata is a species of minute sea snail, a marine gastropod mollusc or micromollusc in the family Scissurellidae, the little slit snails.

Distribution
This marine species occurs off New Zealand.

References

 Geiger D.L. (2012) Monograph of the little slit shells. Volume 1. Introduction, Scissurellidae. pp. 1-728. Volume 2. Anatomidae, Larocheidae, Depressizonidae, Sutilizonidae, Temnocinclidae. pp. 729–1291. Santa Barbara Museum of Natural History Monographs Number 7

External links
 To World Register of Marine Species

Scissurellidae
Gastropods described in 2012